North Atlantic House is a cultural centre located on the harbour front in Copenhagen, Denmark, dedicated to preserve, promote and communicate culture and art from the North Atlantic area. It is made as a cooperation between Denmark, Iceland, Greenland and the Faroe Islands and includes three galleries and conference facilities. The centre also houses the Icelandic embassy and the permanent representations of Greenland and the Faroe Islands, as well as some commercial activities and enterprises related to the area.

Building
The centre is located in an old maritime  warehouse from 1767 by the harbourfront in the Christianshavn neighbourhood of central Copenhagen.

The building is situated by the Greenlandic Trading Square (Danish: Grønlandske Handelsplads), which, for 200 years, was a centre for trade to and from the Faroe Islands, Finnmark, Iceland, and in particular, Greenland. Dry fish, salted herring, whale oil and skins are among the goods that were stored in and around the warehouse before being sold off to European markets.

Activities
The centre arranges a mixture of exhibitions, events, concerts and debates, featuring everything from contemporary art, dance, music, performances and films to lectures.

External links
 Official web site

References

Museums in Copenhagen
Warehouses in Copenhagen
Listed warehouses in Denmark
Listed buildings and structures in Christianshavn
Greenlandic culture
Icelandic culture
Faroese culture
Commercial buildings completed in 1767
1767 establishments in Denmark